Jewel Jacobia Walker (born January 24, 1972) is an American businessman, politician, and former NFL player who served as a member of the Maryland House of Delegates for the 26th district. Walker is also CEO and president of Walker Financial Services and a college football analyst for ESPN.

Early life and education

Born in California, Walker attended University High School in Los Angeles and earned a Bachelor of Arts degree in political science from Howard University.

Career

Football
Walker played quarterback in both college and professional football, after a brief stint in professional baseball. After high school, he was drafted by Major League Baseball's California Angels organization. He spent one year as a pitcher in the minor leagues before deciding to pursue college football. He initially attended Long Beach State but transferred when football was eliminated as a sport at the school.

Walker later joined the Howard Bison, where he set single-season records for pass completions and passing yardage, as well as a single-game record for pass completions (with 38). His passing earned him the nickname "Sky Walker." He was selected to the All-MEAC (Mid-Eastern Athletic Conference) teams in both 1993 and 1994, and named Offensive Player of the Year in 1994. That season, the Bison recorded an undefeated regular season while winning the MEAC championship and a claim to the black college football national championship; the team also secured the school's first NCAA Division I-AA playoff bid and a top-ten national ranking. In 2005, Walker was voted into the Howard University Athletics Hall of Fame.

Walker pursued a professional career in the National Football League when he was selected in the 7th round of the 1994 NFL Draft by the New England Patriots. Walker spent the 1995 season in the World League of American Football with the Barcelona Dragons, where he suffered an injury during a game in which a lack of running backs required him to throw a pass on every play. Following the injury, he lost his job with New England, but he returned to the NFL with the Minnesota Vikings, where he served as a backup for two years. He attempted two career NFL passes, both for completions.

Maryland Legislature
Walker was a member of the Maryland House of Delegates from January 10, 2007 to January 11, 2023. He served on the House Ways and Means Committee. He was also a member of the Legislative Black Caucus of Maryland.

Walker sponsored House Bill 30 in 2007, establishing the Maryland Educational Fund.

In March 2022, Walker announced that he would not seek re-election to any office in 2022.

Personal life 
Walker is married to Monique Anderson-Walker, a politician and candidate for lieutenant governor of Maryland in 2022. He lives in Fort Washington, Maryland, and has three children.

References

External links
 
 

1972 births
African-American state legislators in Maryland
University High School (Los Angeles) alumni
American football quarterbacks
Arizona League Angels players
Barcelona Dragons players
Living people
Democratic Party members of the Maryland House of Delegates
Minnesota Vikings players
College football announcers
Long Beach State 49ers football players
Howard Bison football players
21st-century American politicians
21st-century African-American politicians
20th-century African-American people
New England Patriots players